The Rice Brothers and Adams Building is a building in Myrtle Creek, Oregon, in the United States. It was built in 1915 and was added to the National Register of Historic Places on August 11, 1983.

See also
 National Register of Historic Places listings in Douglas County, Oregon

References

1915 establishments in Oregon
Buildings and structures completed in 1915
Buildings designated early commercial in the National Register of Historic Places
National Register of Historic Places in Douglas County, Oregon